Pink Crustaceans and Good Vibrations is the fifth studio album from Pepper released on July 22, 2008. The title is taken from a fictional album recorded by "Coconut Pete" in the Broken Lizard film Club Dread. The album is produced by Paul Leary. Keyboards by Ronnie King.

Track listing
 "Freeze" - 3:24
 "Davey Jones Locker" - 3:39
 "Things That You Love" - 3:45
 "Wet Dreams" - 2:31
 "Love 101" - 2:35
 "Lucy" - 3:28
 "Musical 69" - 2:53
 "The Phoenix" - 3:47
 "Do Something" - 2:36
 "Slave" - 2:46
 "Ambition" - 3:32
 "Stand And Fall" - 3:00
 "Blackout" - 2:20
 "Drive" - 7:12

Production
Producer - Paul Leary
Engineer - Wyn Davis, Mike Sutherland
Mixing - Wyn Davis
Assistant Engineer - Adam Arnold

Charts
Album - Billboard (North America)

References

2008 albums
Pepper (band) albums